Diplacus jepsonii, formerly classified as Mimulus nanus var. jepsonii, is a species of monkeyflower known by the common name Jepson's monkeyflower.

Description
Diplacus jepsonii is an annual herb producing a thin, erect stem up to about 10 centimeters long. The purple-green leaves are linear to oval in shape and up to 1.4 centimeters in length.

The pinkish purple flower is around a centimeter long, its five-lobed mouth with broad yellow strips and purple spotting. The bloom period is May to  June.

Taxonomy
This plant is sometimes nearly identical to Mimulus nanus, and can be differentiated from it only by close examination of characteristics such as the arrangement of hairs inside the mouth of the flower.

Distribution and habitat
The plant is native to northern California, western Nevada, and southern Oregon, in the Sierra Nevada and southern Cascade Range.

References

External links
 Calflora Database:  Mimulus nanus var. jepsonii (Jepson's monkeyflower)
Jepson Manual eFlora (TJM2): Mimulus nanus var. jepsonii
USDA Plants Profile for Mimulus nanus var. jepsonii (Jepson's monkeyflower)
UC CalPhotos gallery

jepsonii
Flora of California
Flora of Nevada
Flora of Oregon
Flora of the Cascade Range
Flora of the Sierra Nevada (United States)
Flora without expected TNC conservation status